Kurtis McKenzie, formally known as The Arcade, is a British record producer, songwriter, and musician based in Los Angeles. McKenzie is a Grammy Award-winning, Latin Grammy Award-winning, and Academy Award-nominated record producer and composer. He co produced and co-wrote Iggy Azalea's hit single "Fancy" featuring Charli XCX, which has sold 13 million copies worldwide, and is certified 7× platinum in the United States for sales of 7,000,000.

As a producer and songwriter, Mckenzie is responsible for more than 25 million singles sold worldwide; This is due to his work with various Recording artists including Childish Gambino, Kendrick Lamar, Migos, Khalid, Maroon 5, Selena Gomez, Charli XCX, G-Eazy, Doja Cat, Snoh Aalegra, Mark Ronson, Jidenna and many more.

Career
McKenzie began his career producing in his native England, working alongside a number of British artists. In 2011, he worked on the Taio Cruz single, Best Girl. The song was from the UK-singer's first album, which peaked at 14th position in the UK Album Charts. During the same year, McKenzie worked with Girls Aloud-member Nicola Roberts while she was working on her first solo album. Cinderella's Eyes was released in September 2011 and included the track, Take A Bite, which was produced and written by McKenzie. The album itself reached 17th position in the UK Album Charts.

In 2013, McKenzie worked on a number of tracks for Conor Maynard's debut album and was listed as one of the main producers for the album. Maynard's success began in 2012 when McKenzie wrote and produced Maynard's first single, Can't Say No. The song was an instant success and reached number 2 in the UK singles chart. It also received a silver certification. Maynard and McKenzie then collaborated on a second single together, Vegas Girl. The single was again successful, reaching number 4 in the singles chart in the UK. It also had success in other countries, making the top 10 in Belgium and peaking at 11th on the US Bubbling Under Hot 100 Singles chart. The first two singles were followed that up with the album Contrast, which McKenzie help produce. It went straight to number one in the UK Album Charts. The album also went onto receive a silver certification in the UK for the album sales. McKenzie wrote and produced another track on the album, Take Off. The third and final single for McKenzie produced and wrote from the album was Animal, which reached 6th position in the UK album chart.

McKenzie worked with a number of artists throughout 2014, including Rita Ora, Katy B and Iggy Azalea. He produced and wrote the Katy B track, Next Thing. The song appeared on her album Little Red, which reached number one in the UK album charts. McKenzie then teamed up with Australian recording artist, Iggy Azalea. Her debut album was released in 2014, after she had success with a number of singles. McKenzie produced and wrote six of the tracks from the album, while also receiving production and writing credits for the album itself, The New Classic. One of the six tracks written and produced by McKenzie was Fancy, which went onto become a huge global hit. It reached number 1 in four countries and throughout 2014 was one of the best selling songs of the year. It was number one on the US Hot Rap Songs end of year chart. The tracks success meant it received numerous accolades and awards, going platinum in eight countries. The New Classic also received a number of awards, winning both Favorite Rap/Hip-Hop Album at the American Music Awards and Breakthrough Artist Release at the ARIA Music Awards.

Later in 2014, he worked on Rita Ora's track for the film, Beyond the Lights. Ora's track was titled Grateful and appeared on the official soundtrack. Due to the film's success, the track received praise in the music and film industry and was nominated for three separate awards. It was nominated for Best Original Song Written Directly for a Film at the 15th World Soundtrack Awards, nominated for Best Original Song at the 87th Academy Awards and nominated for Best Original or Adapted Song at the 15th Black Reel Awards.

McKenzie teamed up with rappers Jidenna and Kendrick Lamar in 2015 to produce the track, "Classic Man". The song reached 2nd position on the US Rhythmic chart. During the same year, he also worked with Little Mix on their album, Get Weird and the track, OMG. The album had huge commercial success in the United Kingdom, going double-platinum. McKenzie finished the year collaborating with G-Easy on his album track, Calm Down. When It's Dark Out reached number 1 on the US Top R&B/Hip-Hop Albums chart.

In 2016, McKenzie followed up his successes of the previous year by working on two notable tracks. The major release of the year was Maroon 5's Don't Wanna Know, which featured Kendrick Lamar. The track was from Maroon 5's Red Pill Blues album and reached the top ten in 15 countries, including number six in the United States. Its global success meant that it went platinum in eight countries. McKenzie also produced and wrote on his first collaboration with Chris Brown on the track, What Would You Do. The track was unconnected to any of his albums as a standalone track, but was notably released 3 days after he was released following charges of gun possession.

McKenzie teamed up with a number of upcoming artists in 2017, while also working with established artists such as Khaled and Shakira. He also continued his relationship with Maroon 5, working on the production for their 2017 album, Red Pill Blues. McKenzie worked on a handful of singles for UK-based Bipolar Sunshine, the upcoming Swedish singer Léon and Snoh Aalegra. McKenzie also worked on two tracks for Kiiara, one of which was the track, Whippin. The track failed to receive any major chart success in the US, but reached 6th on the New Zealand chart and entered the top 20 in The Netherlands.

During 2017, he also teamed up with Shakira for her album, El Dorado. McKenzie worked on the songwriting and production for the album and also the track, When A Woman. The album was well received in the Billboard Top Latin Albums, reaching 1st position. It was also number one on a number of album charts including, Switzerland. It featured in the top 10 in thirteen countries in total. Its global success led the album to be nominated for a number of album awards. The album was nominated for seven awards at various music award ceremonies. It was nominated in two categories at the Latin American Music Awards, in the Album of the Year and Favorite Album Pop/Rock categories. At the Latin Grammy Awards it was nominated for Album of the Year and won its first award in the Best Contemporary Pop Vocal Album category. It was McKenzie's first award at the Latin Grammys.

In 2018, the awards and nominations continued for El Dorado. Shakira, McKenzie and the rest of the production team won Best Latin Pop Album at the Grammy Awards. The album has also been nominated for Top Latin Album of the Year and Latin Pop Album of the Year at the Latin Billboard Music Awards. McKenzie also worked on the Black Panther soundtrack, collaborating with Kendrick Lamar as a producer and writer on the track, Redemption. He also worked on the track for Migos, "Gang Gang", which appeared on Culture II.

Discography

Singles/Albums

Certifications

Awards

References

External links
 Kurtis McKenzie on Twitter
 Kurtis McKenzie on Instagram

English songwriters
English record producers